The Badminton Asia Championships (formerly Asian Badminton Championships until 2006) is a tournament organized by governing body Badminton Asia to crown the best badminton players in Asia.

The tournament started in 1962 and is held annually since 1991. The event had rotated between team and individual competitions before the team event became null since 1994.

At the 2003 event however, there is a controversy when China decided to pull out from the tournament at the last minute. Head coach Li Yongbo said that the tournament did not award any ranking points for the 2004 Summer Olympics event and wanted to give his players more time to rest. Some of the top players were also willing to pull out from the tournament since the competitiveness of the event was low.

Championships

Individual championships 
The table below states all the host cities (and their countries) of the Asia Championships. The number of events at each has ranged from one to six, and is given in the right-most column.

Team championships
Men's team competition started in 1962 and last played in 1993. In 2016, Badminton Asia decided to create a new men's and women's team championships which also serves as qualification tournament for the Thomas and Uber Cups Finals. Another new team tournament using mixed team format, named as Badminton Asia Mixed Team Championship (also known as Tong Yun Kai Cup), was initiated in 2017. Both championships are biennial, thus following the same pattern as Thomas & Uber Cups finals and the Sudirman Cup.

Badminton Asia Team Championships

Badminton Asia Mixed Team Championships

All-time medal table

Individual championships

Team championships

Men's team

Women's team

Mixed Team championships

Overall (men's, women's and mixed team)

Past winners

Individual competition

Performances by nation

Men's team

Badminton Asia Team Championships
Men's team

Women's team

Badminton Asia Mixed Team Championships

Successful players and national teams

Asian Champions who also became World Champions
List of players who have won Asia Championships and also won the BWF World Championships to become both the Asian Champion and World Champion.

Successful players
Below is the list of the most ever successful players in the Badminton Asia Championships, with 3 or more gold medals.

MS: Men's singles; WS: Women's singles; MD: Men's doubles; WD: Women's doubles; XD: Mixed doubles

Successful national teams
Below are the gold medal teams, shown by year as against by country. China has been the most successful and the only country to achieve a full slate of golds which they did in 2011.

BOLD highlights the overall winner therefore at that Asia Team Championships

 Indonesia won on superior of silver medal, thus, Indonesia became overall winner.
  China won on superior of silver medal to Korea, thus, China became overall winner.
 China won on superior of silver medal of three silver medals to Malaysia none, thus, China became overall winner.
 Indonesia won on superior of silver medal of four silver medals to South Korea one, thus, Indonesia became overall winner.
 China won on superior of silver medal of two silver medals to South Korea none, thus, China became overall winner.
 China won on superior of bronze medal of four bronze medals to South Korea one, thus, China became overall winner.
 China won on superior of bronze medal of four bronze medals to Japan none, thus, China became overall winner.

Men's singles

Women's singles

Men's doubles

Women's doubles

Mixed doubles

Unofficial Asian Badminton Championships 
In addition to official championships, a few invitational Asian championships were also conducted.

See also
Badminton Asia Junior Championships

Note

References

External links
Historical Results of Asia Championships

 
Badminton
Asia
Recurring sporting events established in 1962
1962 establishments in Asia